Montserrat Township is an inactive township in Johnson County, in the U.S. state of Missouri.

Montserrat Township was established in 1890, taking its name from the community of Montserrat, Missouri.

References

Townships in Missouri
Townships in Johnson County, Missouri